Jessica Taylor (born 1980) is an English singer who was a member of Liberty X.

Jessica Taylor may also refer to:

Jessica Taylor (author), British author
Jessica Taylor (athlete) (born 1988), British track and field athlete
Jessica Taylor (died 2003), victim of the Long Island serial killer
Jessica Taylor, candidate in the 2020 United States House of Representatives elections in Alabama